A taproot is a type of plant root.

Taproot may also refer to:

Taproot (album), a 1990 album by Michael Hedges
Taproot (band), an American rock band
Taproot Foundation, an American nonprofit organization
Taproot Theatre Company, Seattle, Washington, U.S.
Tap Roots, a 1948 film starring Van Heflin
Taproot, a Bitcoin soft fork